Duncan Creek is a stream in southern Maries, northwestern Phelps and northeastern Pulaski counties in the Ozarks of the U.S. state of Missouri. It is a tributary of the Gasconade River.

The stream headwaters arise in Maries County approximately 2.5 miles northeast of Dixon on the east side of Missouri Route 28. The stream flows to the southeast through the northeast corner of Pulaski County and into Phelps County to enter the Gasconade about 4.5 miles north of Jerome and 4.5 miles southeast of its source area.

Mungy Branch enters the south side of Duncan Creek about one half mile west of the confluence with the Gasconade.

References

Rivers of Maries County, Missouri
Rivers of Phelps County, Missouri
Rivers of Pulaski County, Missouri
Rivers of Missouri
Tributaries of the Gasconade River